Dykman is a surname. Notable people with the surname include:

Charles P. Dykman, American judge
Janet Dykman (born 1954), American archer
Shlomo Dykman (1917–1965), Polish-Israeli translator and classical scholar

See also
 Dyckman (disambiguation)
 Dykeman (disambiguation)